Sehla (Arabic:سهلة) is a village located in the north of Bahrain, on the outskirts of the capital city Manama. It is located in the Northern Governorate administrative region and is west of Khamis. The village is divided into two sections; North Sehla and South Sehla. This is due to the construction of a highway that passes through the village's centre.

Subdivisions
Sehla is divided into two sections:
North Sehla - Most trading facilities and schools are located in this part of the village.
South Sehla - It is the smaller part of the two divisions, comprising predominantly of farmland.

Political activity
In 2008, protestors clashed with police in the village, which left three cars and a workshop burned down.

Infrastructure
The highway passing through the village is currently scheduled for expansion work.

Notable residents
Jameel al-Nasser - In 2004, he broke the world record for the longest non-stop talk given by a person in 66 hours, breaking previous record-holder Zimbabwean Errol Muzawazi, who spoke on Polish democracy for 62 hours. He had spoken about neurolinguistic programming in Arabic during the 66 hours.

References

Populated places in the Northern Governorate, Bahrain